Dasht-e Nazir (also Romanized as Dasht-e Naz̧īr, Dasht-i-Nazīr, and Dasht Naz̧īr; also known as Dasht Naţīz) is a village in Panjak-e Rastaq Rural District, Kojur District, Nowshahr County, Mazandaran Province, Iran. At the 2006 census, its population was 247, in 69 families.

References 

Populated places in Nowshahr County